Mission Camp, Sardarabad ( – Ārdūgāh Beʿs̱at) is a village in Sardarabad Rural District, in the Central District of Shushtar County, Khuzestan Province, Iran. At the 2006 census, its population was 14, in 4 families.

References 

Populated places in Shushtar County